Inverness is a community located in upper-middle-class suburb Stocksund in Danderyd Municipality in Metropolitan Stockholm, Sweden.

Geography of Stockholm